On 18 June 2022, a public passenger bus was attacked in Nyamagabe District, Southern Province, Rwanda, killing two people.

The bus was driving on the road between Nyambage and Rusizi, crossing through the Nyungwe Forest, in the Kitabi sector of Nyamagabe. The perpetrators stormed the bus and killed the bus driver, then shot and killed a passenger, managing to injure six other passengers. Rwandan authorities described the attackers as "armed thugs" and suspected the armed FLN wing of the rebel Rwanda Movement for Democratic Change (RMDC) of responsibility. The FLN had previously carried out terrorist attacks in Rwanda in 2018 and 2019, which together killed nine people.

See also 
 2022 in Rwanda
 List of terrorist incidents in 2022

References 

2022 in Rwanda
2022 mass shootings in Africa
2020s murders in Rwanda
2022 road incidents
2020s road incidents in Africa
Attacks on transport
June 2022 crimes in Africa
Murder in Rwanda
Southern Province, Rwanda
Terrorist incidents in Africa in 2022
Terrorist incidents in Rwanda
Terrorist incidents on buses in Africa
2022 crimes in Rwanda